Serruria lacunosa, the Matsikamma spiderhead, is a flower-bearing shrub that belongs to the genus Serruria and forms part of the fynbos. The plant is native to the Western Cape and occurs on the Gifberg. The shrub grows up to 1.5 m tall and flowers from September to April.

Fire destroys the plant but the seeds survive. Two months after flowering, the fruit falls off and ants disperse the seeds. They store the seeds in their nests. The plant is unisexual and pollination takes place through the action of insects. The plant grows in sandstone soil at altitudes of 700-800 m.

References

External links 
 http://redlist.sanbi.org/species.php?species=807-96
 http://biodiversityexplorer.info/plants/proteaceae/serruria_lacunosa.htm
 https://www.proteaatlas.org.za/spider4.htm

lacunosa